Cereeae are a tribe of cactus belonging to the Cactoideae subfamily.

Description
Cereeae are tree-like or shrubby, sometimes climbing plants. Your mostly elongated to spherical, ribbed and thorny shoots are not articulated. The flowers, which usually appear on the side of the shoot, open during the day or at night. Their pericarpels usually have a few scales or are completely glabrous. The fleshy, berry-like, bursting or non-bursting fruits often have a blackening adherent flower remnant. The small to large seeds are oval. The hilum and micropyle of the seeds are fused, one appendage is absent.

Genera

References
Soffiatti, P.; Angyalossy, V. Anatomy of Brazilian Cereeae (subfamily Cactoideae, Cactaceae): Arrojadoa Britton & Rose, Stephanocereus A. Berger and Brasilicereus Backeberg. Acta Botanica Brasilica, v. 21, n. 4, 2007.

Cactoideae
Caryophyllales tribes